This is a list of episodes from the reality series The Tester.

Episodes

Season 1: February - April 2010

Season 2: November - December 2010

Season 3: February - April 2012

References

Lists of American non-fiction television series episodes
Lists of reality television series episodes